"Twist and Shout" is a song by Phil Medley and Bert Russell, notably covered by the Isley Brothers and the Beatles.

Twist and Shout could also refer to:

Music

Albums
 Twist & Shout (album), a 1962 album by The Isley Brothers
 Twist and Shout (EP), a 1963 extended play record by the Beatles
 Twist and Shout (album), a 1964 Canadian album by the Beatles

Other songs
 "Twist and Shout" (Deacon Blue song), a 1991 song by Scottish rock band Deacon Blue

Other
 Twist and Shout (film), a 1984 Danish drama film directed by Billie August
 Twist and Shout (Philippine game show), a 2010 television show broadcast on ABS-CBN
 Twist and Shout, Inc., an American software company
 Twist n' Shout, a Loudoun Castle roller coaster in Scotland